John Ioannou John (born 2 June 1958), best known as J.John, is an evangelist and author based in the United Kingdom.

Early life
J.John was born on 2 June 1958 in London, England to his parents, George and Helen Ioannou. J.John's Greek name is Iouannes Iouannon; which translates as John John. His parents were owners and managers of a local restaurant in London. He studied psychology at Hendon College London from 1974 – 1976, where in 1975 he was introduced to Christianity by a friend, the Reverend Andy Economides.

Career
Before working in Christian ministry, J.John started his career in 1976 as a psychiatric nurse at Napsbury Hospital in St Albans, England.

In 1978, J.John studied theology at St John's Theological College, Nottingham, England. In 1980, while studying theology at St John's, J.John worked at the Christian Renewal Centre in Northern Ireland. During this time he took part in reconciliation work as a member of the community, including volunteering at a local prison. Later, J.John became Director of Evangelism at St Nicholas' Church in Nottingham, England, under the leadership of David and Joyce Huggett. 

J.John established Philo Trust as a charity in 1980 in Nottingham, but moved to Chorleywood, England in 1997. The purpose of Philo Trust is to support J.John in his ministry. 'Philo' is the Greek word for brotherly love. Philo Trust has a number of associates, including Christine Caine and Andrew White.  In January 1998 J.John began teaching the Ten Commandments. just10 is his ten-week course teaches why he believes following the 10 laws given to Moses by God are a way to a better life.  just10 was originally named TEN and the original series was filmed in front of a live audience at Capitol Studios.

In 2017, J.John hosted the first JustOne event at Emirates Stadium, home of Arsenal Football Club in London. The name is derived from J.John's just10 course but highlights that event focuses on 'Just One Day, Just One Message, and Just One Invitation'. The second JustOne event took place at Priestfield Stadium on Saturday 9 June 2018. Over 100 churches partnered to make the event possible.

Television 
J.John's Facing the Canon series of programs is filmed in partnership with UCB TV.  J.John interviews a collection of guests including theologians, politicians, activists and musicians. The series is also broadcast by TBN UK.

Publications 
J.John has authored over 60 books since 1988. Select publications include:
A Christmas Compendium (2005)
26 Steps to Heaven (2007)
The Happiness Secret: Finding True Contentment (2011)
The Return: Grace and the Prodigal (2011)
just10 (2013)
The Natural Evangelism Course (2014)
The Life: A Portrait of Jesus (2015 edition)
Knowing God (2017)
The Christmas Story (2018)
The Easter Story (2018)
Jesus Christ - The Truth (2019)
That's a Good Question! (2019)

Personal life
J.John married his wife Killy in 1983. He is a father and a grandfather.

References

External links

English evangelicals
Writers from London
1958 births
English self-help writers
English people of Greek descent
Living people
Television evangelists
Alumni of Middlesex University
Alumni of St John's College, Nottingham
English theologians
English Christians
English evangelists
21st-century English writers
Christian writers
Nurses from London
Holders of a Lambeth degree
Clergy from London